Oravská Lesná (1920-1927 Erdútka, 1927-1945 Erdótka ) is a village and municipality in Námestovo District in the Žilina Region of northern Slovakia.

History
In historical records the village was first mentioned in 1731.

Geography
The municipality lies at an altitude of 934 metres and covers an area of 65.628 km². It has a population of about 3133 people.

Climate
It's the coldest inhabited location in Slovakia.

External links
Official website 

Villages and municipalities in Námestovo District